The 2015–16 National First Division is the second tier league in South Africa. The competition began on 22 August 2015.

League table

Play-offs

Attendances

References

External links
PSL.co.za

National First Division seasons
South
2015–16 in South African soccer leagues